Hearts of Three is an adventure novel by Jack London. The novel was finished right before the writer's death and released in 1919–1920 in the New York Journal. The novel is based on an idea by Charles Goddard.

Plot
Young descendant of the pirate Henry Morgan, who left him a rich heritage, wants to find the treasure of his ancestor. On the way, he meets his distant cousin, also Henry Morgan. Together, they will find dangerous adventures, unknown lands, and love.

Cinematization
In 1992, the novel was cinematized and released under the same title as a TV mini-series in Russia and Ukraine.

References

External links
 

1920 American novels
American novels adapted into television shows
Novels by Jack London
Novels first published in serial form
Novels published posthumously